The Drexel Dragons men's squash team is the intercollegiate men's squash team for Drexel University located in Philadelphia, Pennsylvania. The team competes in the Mid-Atlantic Squash Conference within the College Squash Association. The university first fielded a varsity team in 2011–2012, taking in former world number 1 squash player John White as the head coach.

History 

Squash is an emerging sport at Drexel University, with the men's and women's varsity squash program established in 2011. The men's club team was founded in 2005 by Drs. Evan Cyrkin and Justin Burkholder. On April 25, 2011, the Drexel Athletics Director, Dr. Eric Zillmer, announced the addition of men's and women's squash as varsity programs that will begin competing in the 2011–12 academic year. It was also announced that former world number 1 John White would lead both the men's and women's programs as head coach.

The team has strong ties through volunteer work with Squash Smarts, a Philadelphia Youth Enrichment Program, which combines the sport of squash with academic tutoring and mentoring of under-served urban youth, in order to develop self-esteem and discipline through academic, athletic and personal achievement.

Year-by-year results

Men's Squash 
Updated February 2023.

Players

Current roster 
Updated February 2023.

|}

Notable former players 
Notable alumni include:
Bransten Ming '19, 2x All-American, 2nd most wins in team history (54)

References

External links 
 

 
Squash in Pennsylvania
Sports clubs established in 2011
College men's squash teams in the United States
2011 establishments in Pennsylvania